Events from the year 1693 in Sweden

Incumbents
 Monarch – Charles XI

Events

 - The Riksdag of the Estates is forced to confirm that the King and the Crown Prince has been granted their power from God and are answerable to no one. 
 - A new law on schooling is introduced. 
 
 
 
 
 
 The process against Lars Nilsson (shaman), who is sentenced to death for Paganism for being a follower of the Sami religion.

Births

Deaths
 22 February - Henrik Horn, friherre, military, field marshal (1665), admiral (1677) and member of the Privy Council of Sweden (1677)  (born 1618) 
 17 April - Rutger von Ascheberg, soldier, officer and civil servant (born 1621) 
 - Lars Nilsson (shaman), Sami shaman (born unknown date) 
 26 July - Ulrika Eleonora of Denmark, queen   (born 1656) 
 9 October - Maria Elisabeth Stenbock, courtier

References

 
Years of the 17th century in Sweden
Sweden